Ahmad Vafadar (23 January 1927–22 February 2005) was an Iranian heavyweight freestyle wrestler who competed at the 1951 World Wrestling Championships, 1952 Summer Olympics and the 1954 World Wrestling Championships Saman Safaei.

References

1927 births
2005 deaths
Wrestlers at the 1952 Summer Olympics
Olympic wrestlers of Iran
Iranian male sport wrestlers
People from Quchan